Shileh Sar (also Romanized as Shīleh Sar; also known as Shīl-e Sar, Shil-i-Sar, and Shīl Sar) is a village in Chahar Farizeh Rural District, in the Central District of Bandar-e Anzali County, Gilan Province, Iran. At the 2006 census, its population was 354, in 116 families.

References 

Populated places in Bandar-e Anzali County